Prosheliomyia mirabilis is a species of tachinid flies in the genus Prosheliomyia of the family Tachinidae.

Distribution
Madagascar.

External links

Diptera of Africa
Endemic fauna of Madagascar
Dexiinae
Insects described in 1968